Billboard Top Hits: 1994 is a compilation album released by Rhino Records in 2000, featuring ten hit recordings from 1994.

The track lineup includes three songs that reached the top of the Billboard Hot 100 chart, including the No. 1 song of 1994, "The Sign" by Ace of Base. The remaining songs all reached the top ten of the Hot 100.

Track listing

Track information and credits were taken from the album's liner notes.

References

2000 compilation albums
Billboard Top Hits albums